Talal Assiri (born 2 May 1987) is a Saudi Arabian international football defender.

Career
At the club level, Assiri played for Al-Ittihad.

He is also a member of the Saudi national football team.

External links

1987 births
Living people
Saudi Arabian footballers
Saudi Arabia international footballers
Ittihad FC players
Najran SC players
Al Nassr FC players
Al-Jabalain FC players
Saudi Professional League players
Saudi Second Division players
Association football defenders